Boris Zloković (Serbian Cyrillic: Борис Злоковић; born 16 March 1983) is a Montenegrin retired water polo player.

He was a member of the Montenegro national team at the 2008 Summer Olympics. The team reached the semifinals, where they were defeated by Hungary and finished fourth at the end.  He was also part of the team at the 2012 Summer Olympics, where Montenegro again finished 4th.

Honours

Club
PVK Jadran
Adriatic League: 2009–10
Championship of Serbia & Montenegro: 2002–03, 2003–04 
Montenegrin Championship: 2014–15, 2015–16
Montenegrin Cup: 2014–15, 2015–16
Possilipo
LEN Champions League: 2004–05
LEN Super Cup: 2005
Pro Recco
LEN Champions League: 2011–12; runners-up: 2010–11
LEN Super Cup: 2012
Adriatic League: 2011 –12
Serie A1: 2010–11, 2011–12
Coppa Italia: 2010–11
Radnički Kragujevac
 LEN Euro Cup: 2012–13
LEN Champions League runners-up: 2013–14

See also
 List of world champions in men's water polo
 List of World Aquatics Championships medalists in water polo

References

External links
 

1983 births
Living people
People from Kotor
Montenegrin male water polo players
Olympic water polo players of Montenegro
Water polo players at the 2008 Summer Olympics
Water polo players at the 2012 Summer Olympics
World Aquatics Championships medalists in water polo